Gordon Wesley Graham Taylor (born 1962) is a Canadian politician who was elected in the 2015 Alberta general election to the Legislative Assembly of Alberta representing the electoral district of Battle River-Wainwright.

Electoral history

References

Wildrose Party MLAs
Living people
1962 births
Canadian educators
21st-century Canadian politicians
United Conservative Party MLAs